Toothless is a 1997 American made-for-television fantasy film that first aired as part of The Wonderful World of Disney on ABC and produced by Disney Telefilms and Mandeville Films.

Plot
Katherine Lewis, having been a dentist since her late father and grandfather had each been one, is killed after being struck by a bike messenger. She awakens to find herself in Limbo, a place between Heaven and Hell. In Limbo Katherine is told that she must perform community service as a mythological being before going to Heaven. Katherine signs a contract to be the Tooth Fairy and is trained by a worker named Raul on how to perform her service.

On her first night on the job, Katherine visits a lonely 12-year-old boy named Bobby Jameson and is accidentally discovered by him. As it turns out, children who have baby teeth can see her, while those who have lost all of theirs cannot, as the loss of baby teeth represents the loss of innocence required to see magical beings and creatures. The next day at school, a bully named Jeff and his gang ambush Bobby, and one of them punches him and knocks out another one of his teeth. Katherine comes to visit Bobby again that night and discovers that his mother had died of cancer and his father is always busy at work. Katherine decides to help Bobby and his friends at his school with their problems, which lands her in trouble with the higher-ups in Limbo, as revealing herself to living humans is a grievous infraction. However, she has an all-time high approval rating as Tooth Fairy and is let off with a warning. Katherine feels that the children's needs are greater than hers and asks for Raul's help in making her visible to the parents and the school principal so she can prove that she is real and Bobby is not insane. Raul is touched that Katherine is willing to sacrifice her chance to go to Heaven to help Bobby and his friends and agrees to help her.

Katherine succeeds in becoming visible to the adults by "letting her guard down" and showing Bobby that she cares for him. She proceeds to tell off the parents and principal, but is sent back to Limbo once again for revealing herself to humans.  Once there, Rogers, the supervisor of Limbo, sends Katherine to the Hellavator to be sent to Hell. After saying goodbye to Raul she begins her descent but suddenly finds herself alive and back on Earth. She learns from Raul that not only was she dreaming, but she has been given a second chance at life, as well. She later notices Rogers as a traffic cop who mouths to her that she is watching her. This suggests that Katherine wasn't dreaming after all.

Katherine returns to her job as a dentist with a newfound love of life. She finds Bobby Jameson, a new patient, waiting for his appointment with her. She explains what happened and goes on to live her life to its fullest. After she removes his last baby tooth, though, all of his memories of her as the Tooth Fairy are lost, and she is saddened that he no longer remembers her. However, his father, Thomas, recognizes her from when she turned visible. Katherine asks Thomas and Bobby to go to a baseball game with her, and they accept, which implies the blooming of a romance between Thomas and Katherine which could result in her becoming Bobby's stepmother.

Cast
 Kirstie Alley – Dr. Katherine Lewis
 Jamie Renée Smith – Young Katherine
 Dale Midkiff – Thomas Jameson
 Ross Malinger –  Bobby Jameson
 Daryl Mitchell – Raul
 Kathryn Zaremba – Carrie
 Marcus Toji – Trevor
 Melanie Mayron – Mindy
 Lynn Redgrave – Rogers
 Kimberly Scott – Gwen
 John P. Connolly – Dr. Green
 Catlin Adams – Carrie's Mother
 Patrick Kerr – Mr. Wood
 Jake Richardson – Jeff
 Arjay Smith – Phil
 Eileen Brennan – Joe #1
 Joel Swetow – Joe #2
 Kaley Cuoco – Lori
 Lindze Letherman – Molly
 Helen Slater – Mrs. Lewis
 Lewis Smith – Young Hot Guy
 Yeardley Smith – Gatekeeper
 Joel Brooks – Principal Norris

References

External links 
 
 
 

1997 television films
1997 films
1997 comedy films
1997 fantasy films
1990s children's fantasy films
1990s fantasy comedy films
American children's comedy films
American children's fantasy films
American comedy television films
American fantasy comedy films
Disney television films
Fantasy television films
Films about the afterlife
Films about tooth fairies
Films directed by Melanie Mayron
Films scored by David Michael Frank
Limbo
Films about dentistry
1990s American films